Aibanbha Kupar Dohling (born 23 March 1996), is an Indian professional footballer who plays as a defender for FC Goa in the Indian Super League.

Career

Early career
Born in Sohra, Meghalaya, Dohling started his career in the youth ranks of Shillong Lajong. He was a part of the under-15 side that qualified for the final rounds of the Manchester United Premier Cup in 2010. Dohling then moved to the Tata Football Academy in 2011. While with Tata FA, Dohling played for the academy in various tournaments, including the I-League U19. He also represented Jharkhand in the Santosh Trophy.

After impressing for Tata against Bengaluru FC's under-19 side in the under-19 league, Dohling was offered a trial with the I-League club.

Shillong Lajong
On 4 January 2016, it was announced that Dohling returned to his former club, Shillong Lajong, before the I-League season. He made his professional debut for the club on 17 February 2016 against Mohun Bagan. He came on as an 83rd-minute substitute as Shillong Lajong drew the match 1–1.

FC Goa
On 26 July 2019, ISL side FC Goa confirmed the signing of Dohling, after a successful season with Shillong Lajong.

Career statistics

Club

Honours
Goa
Durand Cup: 2021

References

1996 births
Living people
People from East Khasi Hills district
Indian footballers
Shillong Lajong FC players
Association football defenders
Footballers from Meghalaya
I-League players
Indian Super League players
FC Goa players